Saint-Thuriau is a commune in the Morbihan department of Brittany in north-western France. Inhabitants of Saint-Thuriau are called in French Thuriaviens or Thurialais.

It takes its name from Saint Turiaf of Dol, bishop of the ancient Diocese of Dol.

Twinning
 Calstock, Cornwall, UK

See also
Communes of the Morbihan department

References

External links

 Mayors of Morbihan Association 

Saintthuriau